General elections were held in the Bahamas on 19 August 1992. The ruling Progressive Liberal Party won only 44.7% of the popular vote and 16 seats in the House of Assembly. The  opposition Free National Movement won 55% of the popular vote and 33 of the 49 seats.

Results

References

Bahamas
1992 in the Bahamas
Elections in the Bahamas
Election and referendum articles with incomplete results